In French-speaking countries, a hôtel-Dieu was originally a hospital for the poor and needy, run by the Catholic Church. Nowadays these buildings or institutions have either kept their function as a hospital, the one in Paris being the oldest and most renowned, or have been converted into hotels, museums, or general purpose buildings (for instance housing a préfecture, the administrative head office of a French department).

Therefore, as a secondary meaning, the term hôtel-Dieu can also refer to the building itself, even if it no longer houses a hospital.

Examples include:
Belgium
Notre Dame à la Rose, founded in 1242
France
Hôtel-Dieu d'Angers, founded in 1153
Hôtel-Dieu de Beaune, founded in 1443
Hôtel-Dieu of Carpentras, built in 1754
Hôtel-Dieu of Château-Thierry, founded in 1304
Hôtel-Dieu of Cluny, built in the 17th and 18th century
Hôtel-Dieu de Lyon, created in 1478
Hôtel-Dieu of Nantes, completed in 1508
Hôtel-Dieu de Paris, founded in 650
Hôtel-Dieu of Reims
Hôtel-Dieu de Tonnerre, founded in 1293

Canada
Hôtel-Dieu de Montréal, Montreal, Quebec
Hôtel-Dieu de Québec, Quebec City, Quebec
Hôtel-Dieu de Sherbrooke (CHUS), Sherbrooke, Quebec
Hôtel-Dieu Grace Hospital, Windsor, Ontario
Hotel Dieu Hospital (Kingston, Ontario), Kingston, Ontario
Hotel Dieu Shaver Health and Rehabilitation Centre, St. Catharines, Ontario

United States
University Hospital, New Orleans, previously known as Hôtel-Dieu
 Hotel Dieu Hospital, Beaumont, Texas, founded in 1896 and consolidated with Saint Elizabeth's Hospital in 1970
Hotel Dieu Hospital, El Paso, Texas, founded in 1893 and permanently closed in 1987

Lebanon
Hôtel-Dieu de France, Beirut, Lebanon, a private hospital owned by the French state

See also
French Hospital (disambiguation)
List of hospitals in France

Buildings and structures in France
Hospitals in France
Hospitals in Canada
Catholic hospitals